The "SPICE" ("Smart, Precise Impact, Cost-Effective") is an Israeli-developed, EO/GPS- guidance kit used for converting air-droppable unguided bombs into precision-guided bombs.

The featured guidance system is a derivative of the respective system used in the "Popeye" (AGM-142 Have Nap) air-to-surface missile. The "Spice" family of guided bombs are a product of an Israeli company Rafael Advanced Defense Systems. It achieved initial operational capability in 2003, in Israeli Air Force F-16 squadrons.

Introduction
The "Spice" guided bomb features technology not typically seen in most EO-guided bombs, such as the GBU-15. It combines the advantages of satellite guidance (allowing it to engage camouflaged and hidden targets; to provide a "drop-and-forget" option for several such targets simultaneously and operate in all weather and lighting conditions), and those of electro-optical guidance (such as the ability to provide "man-in-the-loop" guidance for higher precision; the ability to engage relocatable targets; lower CEP than that of satellite-guided munitions; and independence from external information sources like satellites) into one bomb – reducing the number of munitions (and hence, payload) that an aircraft has to carry for a given strike mission, increasing its combat radius and maneuverability. This multiple guidance methods selectability is especially useful in an "information warfare" battlefield, where an aircraft might approach a surface target while it is, for example, masked with smoke (in which case satellite guidance would be required) or moving around (in which case electro-optical guidance would be required).

The "Spice" kit can be fitted with up to 100 targets pre-flight that can be accessed and selected in-flight.

Since it has a total of 12 control surfaces in 3 groups (fore, mid-body, and tail), the "Spice" has a glide range of about 60 kilometers. This allows a striking aircraft to release a bomb at a target without entering the threat envelope of most short- and medium-range air defense systems which offers it some protection. This is achieved while saving the higher costs associated with propelled munitions.

Operational history
On February 26, 2019, the Indian Air Force claims that its Mirage 2000s targeted a militant training camp near the town of Balakot in Khyber Pakhtunkhwa province in Pakistan using SPICE 2000 munitions. This claim by the Indian government was not confirmed by international sources.

During the 2021 Israel–Palestine crisis, the Israeli Air Force used Spice bombs against Al-Sharouk Tower in Gaza. The attack destroyed two residential buildings, killing 6 Palestinian civilians and one Syrian.

Operation
An unguided bomb fitted with a Spice kit can contain up to 100 images of its potential targets.

The bomb is then loaded on a strike aircraft. In the pylon to which the bomb is attached, there is a data link between the aircraft's cockpit and the bomb.

As the aircraft flies in the air and approaches a target, either the weapon systems officer (WSO – the back seater in such aircraft as the F-15E Strike Eagle or F-16I Sufa) or pilot (in single-seat aircraft) can use the TV/IIR display in the cockpit to see the image the bomb sends to them. Once they have selected one of the preprogrammed targets or manually fed the bomb with a target (by feeding it with either an image or geographical coordinates to home on), the bomb is ready for release into a guided trajectory.

Once the bomb is released, it begins searching for its target to acquire it and home in on it. This can be done in several ways:

First, there is pure CCD or IIR (for low lighting conditions) image matching, when the guidance section uses algorithms to match the target image in its memory with the image provided by the seeker and align the center of the seeker's FOV with the desired image (a guidance method known as DSMAC).

Second, if the CCD\IIR seeker cannot acquire its target for any reason (such as visual obstructions), the bomb can automatically switch to GPS\INS guidance. This means that the bomb aspires to bring itself to the target's altitude at a known geographical location. The bomb receives data on its current location from GPS satellites, or from an inertial navigation system in the bomb itself, that has been fed, through the pylon datalink, with the dropping aircraft's coordinates a fraction of a second before the drop and can therefore calculate its coordinates from the dropping time and on.

Third, there is a manual "man-in-the-loop" guidance option, in which the WSO looks at a backseat TV display to see the seeker's view (sent to them through an RF command guidance datalink) and uses the backseat stick to control the bomb to the target. With a skilled WSO that has a "sensitive hand", this guidance method is potentially the most accurate one employed today for air-dropped munitions and has no measurable miss distance. Its main drawback is that it allows for only one bomb to be guided at a time.

Variants
 Spice 1000. An add-on kit for 450 kg (1000 lb) warheads such as the MK-83, MPR1000, BLU-110, RAP-1000 and others. The weapon has deployable wings similar to the JSOW and the SDB that substantially increase its range to 100 km and facilitate the integration to light fighter aircraft.
 Spice 2000. An add-on kit for 900 kg (2000 lb) warheads such as the MK-84, BLU-109, RAP-2000 and others. These bombs were used by IAF's Mirage-2000 at Balakot in Pakistan.
 Spice 250.
 Spice 250 ER.

Operators

Specifications

 Warhead: Mk. 83 (453 kg) or Mk. 84 (907 kg)
 CEP: 3 meters
 Guidance type: CCD\infrared homing with GPS\INS
 Carrying-capable aircraft: F-15, F-16, Mirage 2000, Tornado, FA-50, F-35

See also
 Joint Direct Attack Munition (JDAM)
 Small Diameter Bomb
 MLGB
 MSOV
 H-4 SOW
 GBU-53/B
 AGM-154 Joint Standoff Weapon
 AASM
 HGK
 KGGB
 FT PGB
 LS PGB
 LT PGB
 Umbani

References

External links
 "Spice" brochure on Rafael website
 

Rafael Advanced Defense Systems
Aerial bombs of Israel
Guided bombs of Israel
Military equipment introduced in the 2000s
Fire-and-forget weapons